Cedar Creek is a  stream in southeastern Wisconsin in the United States. The Cedar Creek watershed is a 330 km2 (127 mi2) sub-basin of the larger Milwaukee River watershed. It originates from Big Cedar Lake in the town of West Bend, then flows east into Little Cedar Lake. Cedar Creek then flows eastward through Jackson Wisconsin toward Lake Michigan before turning south. Flowing southward the creek crosses State Highway 60 where there is a USGS gauge and briefly flows through Grafton Wisconsin before entering Cedarburg Wisconsin on its north side. Cedar Creek flows through downtown Cedarburg, and empties into the Milwaukee River southeast of Cedarburg in the Town of Grafton. The lower section through Cedarburg is notable for its the steep slope, and early settlers made use of this by building several mills and accompanying dams.

The lower portion of the creek through downtown Cedarburg until its confluence with the Milwaukee River is adversely impacted by the milldams and PCB pollution produced by Mercury Marine and Amcast automotive. Numerous cleanups have occurred, the most recent cleanup from the ruck pond to the wire and nail dam was completed in 2018, with cleanup from the wire and nail dam to the Milwaukee River set to take place in the 2020s.

Mills 
Several mills and accompanying dams were built on the lower portion of Cedar Creek in the mid and late 19th century. The mills proved successful and had large impacts on the local economy. By the early 20th century many of the mills had moved away from hydropower to more reliable steam or electric power. Financial trouble for the mills began during the great depression and continued into later decades as larger mills and factories outcompeted the small mills. By the late 1960s all the mills had either ceased milling operations or shut down entirely. Today some of the mills have found other uses hosting stores, restaurants, offices, and a brewpub, while others remain unused or have been demolished.

Flooding 
Cedar Creek is normally a small low discharge stream, however like many streams it experiences regular flooding. In 1881 a sudden spring melt caused severe flooding that washed out all the milldams on Cedar Creek except the one at the Cedarburg Mill. The flood also washed away at least one bridge. Large floods occurred in 1952, 1959, 1960, and 1975. In 1996 flooding washed out the dam at the Concordia Mill, its millpond contained PCBs, and the washout complicated the cleanup by sending PCBs downstream.

Parks

Bridges

Notes

Rivers of Wisconsin
Rivers of Ozaukee County, Wisconsin
Rivers of Washington County, Wisconsin
Superfund sites in Wisconsin